Globish (also known as Parallel English) is a constructed language created by Madhukar Gogate that attempts to simplify English, including the use of phonetic spelling, and the removal of most punctuation and capital letters. It was presented to the Simplified Spelling Society (now known as English Spelling Society) of the United Kingdom in 1998. According to its creator, it can be considered an artificial English dialect, as proof of the possibility of simplifying the orthography and pronunciation of standard English.

Alphabets 
Globish uses ISO Latin Alphabets, with no diacritics or upper cases.

See also
Globish (Nerrière)

References

External links
 Globish (Parallel English with neat spelling)
 Globish (Parallel English) Principles
 Glimpses of Globish (Parallel English)

Constructed languages
Controlled English
English as a global language
Constructed languages introduced in the 1990s
1998 introductions

fr:Globish#Essais de formalisation du globish